The Kaisermarsch (Imperial March) is a patriotic march composed by Richard Wagner in 1871 in order to exalt the foundation of the German Empire after the victorious Franco-Prussian War.

History
The victory in the Franco-Prussian War and the consequent proclamation of William I, King of Prussia, as German Emperor spurred patriotism and incited several German composers to write patriotic music dedicated to the nation and the new empire. Johannes Brahms, for example, wrote his Song of Triumph (op. 55) in 1871.

Wagner, already known for his musical patriotism in several of his operas, hence composed the Kaisermarsch which entailed both positive and negative reviews but did not succeed in attaining a more prominent status with regard to official ceremonies celebrating the newly achieved victory. Wagner wrote:

Wagner's estranged friend Friedrich Nietzsche wrote derisively of the work, that "to Wagner's Kaisermarsch, not even the young German Kaiser [i.e. Wilhelm II] could march".

Text
The text of the march did not become popular, and is rarely sung when the Imperial March is performed nowadays. The main reason for this is the low quality of the text, which emanates from the fact that it was written after the composition of the tune and thus had to be "trimmed" in order to fit the melody.

Patriotic Wagnerian Music
Another patriotic piece by Wagner is Hans Sachs′s final monologue in Die Meistersinger when he warns his fellow Germans to protect German culture from foreign influence:

In the third act of Lohengrin, King Henry praises the Germans of Brabant and their will to defend the Empire against Hungarian attacks:

References

Compositions by Richard Wagner
German patriotic songs
German music
German culture